Elizabeth Reiter is an American operatic soprano who has been based at the Oper Frankfurt from 2013, where she covered a broad repertoire from Armida in Handel's Rinaldo to the double role Renee/Alice in the German premiere of Olga Neuwirth's Lost Highway. She performed at international opera houses and festivals, such as singing Zerlina in Mozart's Don Giovanni in Tanglewood, conducted by James Levine.

Career 
Reiter was born in Chicago where she was a member in the Lyric Opera's children's choir. She sang as a child in over 100 productions, for example in Puccini's La Bohème and Tosca, Ponchielli's La Gioconda, Boito's Mefistofele, Bizet's Carmen, Tchaikovsky's Queen of Spades, Verdi's Otello and Humperdinck's Hansel and Gretel at the Lyric Opera. At the age of 16, Reiter made her professional debut as Young Maria Celeste in the world premiere of Glass's Galileo Galilei (Chicago’s Goodman Theatre, Brooklyn Academy of Music, and London’s Barbican Center). She studied at the Manhattan School of Music and the Curtis Institute of Music where she performed several roles in the opera program. She took part in the Metropolitan Opera National Council Auditions.

Reiter joined the Oper Frankfurt in the 2013/14 season, where she appeared in roles including Armida in Handel's Rinaldo, Mozart's Susanna in Le nozze di Figaro and Pamina in Die Zauberflöte, Gretel in Humperdinck's Hänsel und Gretel, Valencienne in Lehàr's Die lustige Witwe, Anne Trulove in Stravinsky's The Rake's Progress,  Renee / Alice in Neuwirth's Lost Highway, and the title role in Janáček's Das schlaue Füchslein. In 2018, she appeared in the double role Renee/Alice in the German premiere of Olga Neuwirth's Lost Highway. A reviewer of the Los Angeles Times noted:

In September 2021, she appeared as Melissa in Handel's Amadigi, conducted by Roland Böer, and alongside Brennan Hall in the title role, Kateryna Kasper and Beth Taylor. A reviewer noted her sharp coloraturas and dramatic outbursts, portraying the harsh character, and intense acting up to her death scene.

She appeared as a guest at Opera Memphis and the Opera Philadelphia among others. She performed as Zerlina in Mozart's Don Giovanni at the Tanglewood Music Center, conducted by James Levine, and as The Dragonfly in Ravel's L'enfant et les sortilèges at the Castleton Festival, conducted by Lorin Maazel.

During the COVID-19 pandemic, she gave house concerts from her home.

References

External links 
 
 
 Elizabeth Reiter / Albums Naxos Records
 Elizabeth Reiter goodmantheatre.org
 Aspen Music Festival musicweb-international.com 2004
 

American sopranos
Manhattan School of Music alumni
Curtis Institute of Music alumni
Living people
Year of birth missing (living people)
21st-century American women